Route 231 is a provincial highway located in the Montérégie region of Quebec. It runs from the junction of Route 112 between Rougemont and Saint-Césaire northeastward towards Saint-Hyacinthe until the junction of Route 116.

Municipalities along Route 231
 Rougemont
 Saint-Damase
 Saint-Hyacinthe - (Notre-Dame-de-Saint-Hyacinthe)

See also
 List of Quebec provincial highways

References

External links 
 Official Transports Quebec Road Network Map 
 Route 231 on Google Maps.

231
Roads in Montérégie
Transport in Saint-Hyacinthe